Semirosalina is a genus of foraminifera from the Lower Miocene of New Zealand, related to Rosalina, included in discorbacean family Rosalinidae.  The test is a small trochospiral coil of few whorls with a few subglobular chambers per whorl. The test wall is thin and finely perforate. The aperture at the umbilical margin of the apertural face.

Semirosalina differs from Rosalina in being smaller in size, having fewer chambers, and an inflated rather than a flattened test.

References 

 Alfred R. Loeblich Jr & Helen Tappan, 1988. Forminiferal Genera and their classification. Geological Survey of Iran, (e-book) 2005. 

Rosalinidae
Rotaliida genera